Sweden chose its entry for Eurovision Song Contest 1960 by the national final, Melodifestivalen 1960. The winning song, "Alla andra får varann" was performed once by Östen Warnerbring and once by Ingrid Berggren. However Sveriges Radio decided that Siw Malmkvist would represent Sweden, as she had been denied that the previous year.

Before Eurovision

Melodifestivalen 1960
Melodifestivalen 1960 was the selection for the third song to represent Sweden at the Eurovision Song Contest. It was the second time that this system of picking a song had been used. It was held on 2 February 1960, however an internal semi-final, not broadcast on radio or television, was held on 28 December 1959, where the 8 songs were reduced to 4. Approximately 1100 songs were submitted to SVT for the competition. The final was broadcast on Sveriges Radio TV and Sveriges Radio P1 from Cirkus, Stockholm and the presenter was Jeannette von Heidenstam. Last year's winner Siw Malmkvist was selected to sing the winning song, "Alla andra får varann", at Eurovision.

At the final of Melodifestivalen two artists sang the same song, one with a large orchestra and a second with a smaller orchestra.

1: Performer with large orchestra
2: Performer with smaller orchestra

At Eurovision
On the night of the final Siw Malmkvist performed 2nd in the running order, following United Kingdom and preceding Luxembourg. At the close of voting "Alla andra får varann" had received 4 points, placing Sweden joint 10th (with Denmark) of the 13 entries. The Swedish jury awarded its highest mark (4) to Belgium and to contest winners France.

Voting 
Every country had a jury of ten people. Every jury member could give one point to his or her favourite song.

References

External links
TV broadcastings at SVT's open archive
Swedish National Final page

1960
Countries in the Eurovision Song Contest 1960
1960
Eurovision
Eurovision

es:Melodifestivalen 1960
pt:Melodifestivalen 1960
sv:Melodifestivalen 1960